The American Music Award for Top Soundtrack has been awarded since 1996. Years reflect the year in which the awards were presented, for works released in the previous year (until 2003 onward when awards were handed out in November of the same year). Originally entitled Favorite Soundtrack, the Pitch Perfect series is the only film series to have all of their films win in this category.

Winners and nominees

1990s

2000s

2010s

2020s

References

American Music Awards
Awards established in 1996
Awards established in 2007
Awards established in 2013
Awards disestablished in 2003
2003 disestablishments in the United States
Awards disestablished in 2010
Album awards